Teruel may refer to:

Places
Teruel, a municipality of province of Teruel, Aragon, Spain.
Province of Teruel, a province of Aragon, Spain.
Teruel Community, a comarca of province of Teruel, Aragon, Spain.
Teruel, Huila, a municipality in the Huila Department, Colombia.

Sports
CD Teruel, a Spanish football team based in Teruel, Aragon, Spain.
CV Teruel, a Spanish volleyball team based in Teruel, Aragon, Spain.

Other
Teruel (Spanish Congress Electoral District), the electoral district covering the province for elections to the Spanish Parliament.
Teruel Airport, an international airport near Teruel, Aragon, Spain.
Teruel Power Plant, a lignite fired power plant near the town of Andorra in the province of Teruel, Aragon, Spain.
Teruel Cathedral, a church in Teruel, Aragon, Spain.
L'espoir (In Spanish Sierra de Teruel), a 1945 Spanish black and white war film.
Battle of Teruel, was fought in and around the city of Teruel during the Spanish Civil War.
Teruel (multiple rocket launcher), a multiple rocket launcher was in service with the Spanish Army until 2009.
Lovers of Teruel, a romance story that is alleged to have taken place in 1217 in the city of Teruel, Aragon, Spain.
The Lovers of Teruel (film), a 1962 French musical film directed by a 1962 French musical film directed by Raymond Rouleau.